The continental Navy frigate USS Deane was originally a ship secretly ordered by the American Commissioners from the Nantes shipowner .

This 400 ton 'merchant' ship, then named the Lyon, with 32 gun emplacements, was fitted with 24 cannons and was built by Bourmaud. The number of cannons attracted the attention of the local maritime authorities, who notified the Minister of Marine. Having been paid through a Paris banker, Jean Peltier denied any other use apart from trade, and, on 3 November 1777, indicated in the deed of purchase that there was "absolutely no foreign involvement" and that the ship would be commanded by a Frenchman, Barthélémy Corvaisier, on the voyage to Santo Domingo.

Even though suspicions had not completely disappeared, fortunately French intentions towards the USA had changed and Jean Peltier was encouraged to hasten the preparation of the ship. On 12 February 1778, the Lyon joined the Duc de Choiseul and the Brume in Saint Nazaire to then sail to the Quiberon Bay, where the escort of La Motte-Picquet was waiting to accompany them the 900 km to the United States. However disagreements with Samuel Nicholson led to the departure of a large number of the French crew, including Nicolas Baudin, and the embarkation of 102 American 'passengers'. An agreement was signed between Jonathan Williams and Nicholson and Corvaisier stepped down. Nicholson took command and renamed the ship the Deane after American Founding Father Silas Deane. On 14 February the crew was present at the 13-gun salute by John Paul Jones fired from the 'Ranger' and the 9-gun salute in response from La Motte-Picquet, in recognition of the American nation. And brought to the United States in May 1778 to be prepared for sea. She was named Hague in 1782, and was taken out of commission in 1783.

Career

She returned to Philadelphia 17 April with one prize, the armed ship Viper. The frigates arrived at Boston 6 September with 250 prisoners after one of the most notable cruises of the Continental Navy.

In May, Lloyd's List reported that the rebel frigates Dean and Protector had captured John, Ashburner, master, from Lancaster to St. Kitts, and a ship sailing from Glasgow to Jamaica with 90-0 barrels of beef and a quantity of dry goods, and had taken them into Martinique.

Deane again cruised with Confederacy and Saratoga in the West Indies in 1782, capturing four prizes. In April 1782 she captured the cutter . After two more cruises in the Caribbean, one in September 1782 and the other in 1783, she was renamed Hague in September 1782 (perhaps because of false accusation against Deane that was current at the time).

Fate
Deane was taken out of commission in 1783 at Boston.

Citations

Bibliography 
Tugdual de Langlais, L'armateur préféré de Beaumarchais … Jean Peltier Dudoyer, de Nantes à l'Isle de France, Coiffard Éditions, Nantes, 2015, 340 p.

Howard I. Chapelle, The History of the American Sailing Navy – The ships and their Development. W.W. Norton & Company, inc. - New-York – 1949, p 97, 537.

References 

Demerliac, Alain (1996) La Marine De Louis XVI: Nomenclature Des Navires Français De 1774 À 1792. (Nice: Éditions OMEGA).
Départemental Archives of Loire-Atlantique. Arms roles C.1277, year 1778, N° 12. The Deane was then named Lyon.
Departmental Archives of Loire-Atlantique. C art 1030: Captain Corvaisier relieved of his responsibility by Jonathan Williams by reason of his disagreement with Nicholson. 'The present document will serve as a release with regards to Monsieur Peltier Dudoyer.' Statement signed on 17 February 1778 by Jonathan Williams, Agent of the American Commissioners on board the 'Robuste', ship commanded by La Motte-Picquet.

External links
Biography of Asa Lawrence which talks about his service aboard the Deane and the ship's history.
https://www.delanglais.fr/Peltier/html/sommaire.html [archive]

Sailing frigates of the United States Navy
Ships of the Continental Navy
Ships built in France
Ships named for Founding Fathers of the United States